Highland Park is a 2013 American dramedy film directed by Andrew Meieran and starring Danny Glover, Parker Posey and Billy Burke.

Based in Detroit, it is about a high school faculty lottery pool that hopes the lucky numbers they've played for ten years will finally pay off, after discovering budget cuts have eliminated their jobs.

Plot
Set in the economically depressed Detroit suburb of Highland Park, the city’s infrastructure is crumbling and the mayor is destructive rather than constructive. Six downtrodden friends connected through the local school (teachers, admin and maintenance) play the lottery with the same numbers every week for ten years, hoping to win big and change their lives. They also hope to use some of the prize money to stop their community’s backslide into poverty. 

After so many years of playing the same numbers, Principal Lloyd Howard is disillusioned and decides he is out. He can’t bear to tell his teachers and support staff that they are all about to lose their jobs. He only tells Ed, the school’s retired maintenance worker who continues to work on the furnaces, whose task it is to buy the ticket.

Ed has an epiphany about the group’s luck, on his way to get the ticket before spending the next day’s fishing. A waitress, whose nametag says ‘Destiny’, hands him a plate of fortune cookies, enticing him to grab one. 

Ex-homecoming queen Shirley Paine, the Mayor of Highland Park, arrives to Principal Howard’s office to personally give him the cuts in the high school. She keeps cutting the budget in Highland Park in areas that help the community (like healthcare, firefighters, the library, education, parks, sewer cleanup) in favor of vanity projects like malls and a stadium for her rich connections.

A desperate Jess, now unemployed bus driver, tries to knock over a convenience store with a toy gun, but the clerk recognises him, turning him away. Arriving at his estranged ex’s, she refuses to let him see his kids as he’s behind on his  child support payments. 

When it comes out that he has had to cut jobs and programs, Howard finds himself as the bearer of bad news and is viewed as a pariah in the community. Even the butcher  chews him out, as his son is a senior on the football team.

But finally the school lotto pool’s numbers are called after so many years of playing them. Lloyd Howard and the other members of the betting pool suddenly find their lives turned around. They begin making big purchases and revitalizing the local economy. 

Pushing for grant money, Howard uses resources based on the promise of the winnings. He gets into a game of one-upsmanship in with Mayor Shirley Paine, spending both private and public funds to revitalize Highland Park. 

When Ed returns from his time in the woods fishing, days after the winning numbers were called, and reveals that he bought the ticket with different numbers, everyone but Howard turns against him. Howard has to go up against Paine without any resources and suffers her wrath when she turns the media on him.

Ed, after realizing it’s his fault for not buying the lotto ticket that everyone planned on, gives a speech about how everyone is the same as they were before they thought they won the money, so they are not out anything. 

Lloyd Howard is painted early on as an idealist and a former troublemaker who has since made good as the beleaguered school principal. His body language changes, as if he has been carrying a great weight for a long time and then his whole posture changes as he becomes more assertive. He has a kind of spiritual rebirth.

The lottery group regroups, and thanks to the mayor’s now former assistant, they are able to hack Mayor Paine’s laptop, recovering incriminating e-mails. Howard pressures the mayor, through threatening to expose her corruption, into putting the money back into Highland Park. 

Hope for the future is restored, both for the community that was originally meant to be a kind of beacon for the surrounding area, as well as for the six original lottery group members.

Cast
Billy Burke as Lloyd Howard
Kimberly Elise as Toni
John Carroll Lynch as Rory
Parker Posey as Shirley Paine
Danny Glover as Ed
Rockmond Dunbar as Shaun
Eric Ladin as Jessie
Deborah Ann Woll as Lilly
Haaz Sleiman as Ali Rasheed
Bob Gunton as Bert
Michelle Forbes as Sylvia Howard
Bo Derek as Destiny
Vernee Watson-Johnson as May
Blake Clark as Hal
Stephanie Koenig as Eileen

Reception
Leonard Maltin awarded the film two and half stars.

References

External links
 
 

American comedy-drama films
2010s English-language films
2010s American films